Marta Śrutwa (born December 10, 1997) is a Polish female acrobatic gymnast. With partners Karolina Nowak and Agnieszka Rawinis, Srutwa competed in the 2014 Acrobatic Gymnastics World Championships. She is daughter of Mariusz Śrutwa.

References

1997 births
Living people
Polish acrobatic gymnasts
Female acrobatic gymnasts
Place of birth missing (living people)